The Mississippi slimy salamander (Plethodon mississippi) is a species of terrestrial plethodontid salamander found throughout most of the U.S. state of Mississippi, western Alabama, western Tennessee, far western Kentucky, and eastern Louisiana. The Mississippi slimy salamander is part of the larger slimy salamander (P. glutinosus) complex.

The Mississippi slimy salamander is generally black in color with white, silver, or bronze spots on its back. Females remain with their clutches (about 17 eggs) for up to two weeks before the offspring disperse.

References

mississippi
Amphibians of the United States
Amphibians described in 1989